Lake Nabberu is a large salt lake located in the Mid West region of Western Australia. It extends into the centre of the Shoemaker crater. The edges of the lake are surrounded by low dune ridges, which support meager vegetation growth.

See also

 List of lakes of Western Australia

References

Nabberu
Nabberu